Kumluca is a village in the Hasankeyf District of Batman Province in Turkey. The village had a population of 28 in 2021.

The hamlets of Altıhan and Taşlı are attached to the village.

References 

Villages in Hasankeyf District
Kurdish settlements in Batman Province